Pandalapaka may refer to:

Pandalapaka, East Godavari district, a village in Andhra Pradesh, India
Pandalapaka, Visakhapatnam district, a village in Andhra Pradesh, India